= 2009 Brazilian federal budget =

2009
- Submitted: 27 August 2008
- Submitted by: Luiz Inácio Lula da Silva
- Submitted to: National Congress of Brazil
- Total revenue: $657.9 billion (USD)
- Total expenditures: $657.9 billion (USD)

The 2009 Brazilian federal budget was submitted to the National Congress of Brazil by President Luiz Inácio Lula da Silva on August 27, 2008.

== Total receipts ==
The total receipts for fiscal year 2009 are estimated at US$657.9 billion.

- Primary receipts: $258.9 billion
  - $157.8 billion - Federal taxes and tributes
  - $43.6 billion - Social security contributions
  - $57.5 billion - Other
- Financial income: $399 billion

Total income: $657.9 billion

== Total expenses ==
The total expenses for 2009 amount to US$657.9 billion.

- Mandatory spending: $541 billion
  - $49.9 billion - Payroll
  - $20.8 billion - Social security
  - $345.7 billion - Public debt amortization
  - $69.7 billion - Public debt interest
  - $17.5 billion - Investments
  - $14 billion - Reserve
  - $23.4 billion - Other financial expenses
- Discretionary spending: $116.9 billion

Total expenses: $657.9 billion
